A by-election was held for the New South Wales Legislative Assembly electorate of The Williams on 16 February 1860 because Stephen Dark resigned.

Dates

Polling places

Result

Stephen Dark resigned.

See also
Electoral results for the district of Williams
List of New South Wales state by-elections

References

1860 elections in Australia
New South Wales state by-elections
1860s in New South Wales